The 2022 CS Nepela Memorial was held on September 29–October 1 in Bratislava, Slovakia. It was part of the 2022–23 ISU Challenger Series. Medals were awarded in the disciplines of men's singles, women's singles, and ice dance.

Entries
The International Skating Union published the list of entries on September 6, 2022.

Changes to preliminary assignments

Results

Men

Women

Ice dance

References

External links 
 Official website

2022 in figure skating
CS
CS
Sports competitions in Bratislava